Bogdan Stimoff is a 1916 silent drama film directed by Georg Jacoby and starring Georg Reimers, Lotte Medelsky, and Carl Goetz. It was made as a co-production between Bulgaria, Germany and the Austrian Empire, the allied Central Powers of the First World War.

Location shooting took place around the Bulgarian capital Sofia.

Cast
Georg Reimers as Bogdan Stimov
Lotte Medelsky as Ana
Carl Goetz as Selskiyat idiot
Alfred Valters
Marietta Pikaver
Hans Lackner
Fritz Wrede
Josef Rehberger
Viktor Franz
Tsar Ferdinand I of Bulgaria as himself
Tsaritsa Eleonore of Bulgaria as herself

References

External links

Bulgarian silent films
Films of the German Empire
German silent feature films
Films directed by Georg Jacoby
German drama films
Austrian drama films
1916 drama films
Films set in Bulgaria
Films shot in Bulgaria
German black-and-white films
Austrian black-and-white films
Austro-Hungarian films
Bulgarian black-and-white films
Bulgarian drama films
Silent drama films
1910s German films
1910s German-language films